Independence is a rural city in Hennepin County, Minnesota, United States. Most of the city is agricultural land with dense woods and numerous lakes. It is named after Lake Independence, a large lake on the community's eastern boundary.

The population was 3,504 at the 2010 census. U.S. Highway 12 serves as a main route in the community.

Geography
Independence is 24 miles west of Minneapolis.

Demographics

2010 census
As of the census of 2010, there were 3,504 people, 1,241 households, and 1,009 families living in the city. The racial makeup of the city was 97.1% White, 0.3% African American, 0.3% Native American, 1.1% Asian, 0.2% from other races, and 1.0% from two or more races. Hispanic or Latino of any race were 1.3% of the population.

There were 1,241 households, of which 37.2% had children under the age of 18 living with them, 74.1% were married couples living together, 4.4% had a female householder with no husband present, 2.9% had a male householder with no wife present, and 18.7% were non-families. 14.9% of all households were made up of individuals, and 4.7% had someone living alone who was 65 years of age or older. The average household size was 2.80 and the average family size was 3.13.

The median age in the city was 45.6 years. 26.3% of residents were under the age of 18; 5.8% were between the ages of 18 and 24; 16.6% were from 25 to 44; 38.9% were from 45 to 64; and 12.5% were 65 years of age or older. The gender makeup of the city was 50.9% male and 49.1% female.

2000 census
As of the census of 2000, there were 3,236 people, 1,088 households, and 908 families living in the city. The racial makeup of the city was 97.74% White, 0.09% African American, 0.19% Native American, 1.05% Asian, 0.03% Pacific Islander, 0.22% from other races, and 0.68% from two or more races. Hispanic or Latino of any race were 0.87% of the population.

There were 1,088 households, out of which 40.5% had children under the age of 18 living with them, 75.4% were married couples living together, 5.0% had a female householder with no husband present, and 16.5% were non-families. 11.7% of all households were made up of individuals, and 3.2% had someone living alone who was 65 years of age or older.  The average household size was 2.97 and the average family size was 3.25.

In the city, the population was spread out, with 30.1% under the age of 18, 5.0% from 18 to 24, 29.0% from 25 to 44, 27.7% from 45 to 64, and 8.2% who were 65 years of age or older.  The median age was 39 years. For every 100 females, there were 105.1 males.  For every 100 females age 18 and over, there were 103.2 males.

The median income for a household in the city was $79,126, and the median income for a family was $82,143. Males had a median income of $50,793 versus $40,625 for females. The per capita income for the city was $35,753.  About 0.8% of families and 1.3% of the population were below the poverty line, including 1.3% of those under age 18 and none of those age 65 or over.

Politics
Independence has been a Republican jurisdiction in Minnesota in recent years. The city has voted for every Republican presidential nominee since 1980, with the last five campaigns carrying the town by a margin of over 25 points each.

Politics

References

External links
 City Website

Cities in Minnesota
Cities in Hennepin County, Minnesota